Zapovedny is a rural locality (a settlement) in Gubkinsky District, Belgorod Oblast, Russia. The population was 165 as of 2010. There are 2 streets.

Geography 
Zapovedny is located 21 km southeast of Gubkin (the district's administrative centre) by road. Zagorny is the nearest rural locality.

References 

Rural localities in Gubkinsky District